Lengthy Night is a 2018 Armenian drama film directed by Edgar Baghdasaryan. It was selected as the Armenian entry for the Best International Feature Film at the 92nd Academy Awards, but it was not nominated. Lengthy Night managed to win in five other categories at the 2019 Anahit Awards presented by the National Armenian Film Academy, in addition to the top prize for best film.

Plot
An unusual stone ties together three stories set in the early 2000s, the Armenian genocide of 1915 and the 11th century.

Cast
 Shant Hovhannisyan
 Samvel Grigoryan
 Luiza Nersisyan
 Babken Chobanyan

See also
 List of submissions to the 92nd Academy Awards for Best International Feature Film
 List of Armenian submissions for the Academy Award for Best International Feature Film

References

External links
 

2018 films
2018 drama films
Armenian drama films
Armenian-language films